Umberto Guarnieri (born 2 May 1919 in Milan) was an Italian professional football player.

Honours
 Serie A champion: 1939/40.
 Coppa Italia winner: 1938/39.

1919 births
Year of death missing
Italian footballers
Serie A players
Serie B players
Como 1907 players
Inter Milan players
Calcio Padova players
U.S. Cremonese players
A.C. Milan players
A.C. Legnano players
Aurora Pro Patria 1919 players
Brescia Calcio players
Piacenza Calcio 1919 players
Association football forwards